The 2003 UCI Track Cycling World Championships were the World Championship for track cycling. They took place at the Hanns-Martin-Schleyer-Halle in Stuttgart, Germany from July 30 to August 3, 2003. The championships were due to be held in Shenzhen, China, but were moved to Stuttgart following the 2003 SARS outbreak in China.

One of Germany's best chances of earning a gold medal was the men's team pursuit, having broken the four-minute barrier at the 2000 Olympics. However, Erfurt coach Jens Lang and his cyclist Jens Lehmann disagreed with the national team selection, and threatened with not competing with Berlin riders Robert Bartko and Guido Fulst. As a result, the German federation decided to withdraw from the team pursuit event, and later decided to suspend the Erfurt riders from the national team.

Medal table

Medal summary

References

External links
World Track Championships - CM Stuttgart, Germany, July 30 - August 3, 2003 Cycling News

 
Uci Track Cycling World Championships, 2003
Track cycling
UCI Track Cycling World Championships by year
International cycle races hosted by Germany
July 2003 sports events in Europe
August 2003 sports events in Europe